Ellie is a character in the video game series The Last of Us by Naughty Dog. She is portrayed by Ashley Johnson through motion capture and voice acting; in the television adaptation, she is portrayed by Bella Ramsey. In the first game, The Last of Us (2013), Joel Miller is tasked with escorting a 14-year-old Ellie across a post-apocalyptic United States in an attempt to create a cure for an infection to which Ellie is immune. While players briefly assume control of Ellie for a portion of the game, the artificial intelligence primarily controls her actions, often assisting in combat by attacking or identifying enemies. Ellie reappeared as the playable character in the downloadable content prequel The Last of Us: Left Behind, in which she spends time with her friend Riley. In The Last of Us Part II (2020), players control a 19-year-old Ellie as she seeks revenge on Abby for Joel's death.

Ellie was created by Neil Druckmann, the creative director and writer of The Last of Us. Inspired by a mute character proposed for Uncharted 2: Among Thieves, he created her as a strong female character who has a close relationship with Joel; throughout the first game's development, the relationship between Ellie and Joel was the central focus. Johnson inspired aspects of Ellie's personality, prompting Druckmann to make her more active in fighting hostile enemies. Following comparisons to the likeness of Canadian actor Elliot Page, Naughty Dog redesigned Ellie's appearance to better reflect Johnson's personality and make her younger. For her performance in Part II, Johnson considered her own experiences with anxiety and researched the effects of post-traumatic stress disorder.

The character has been well-received by critics, with Ellie's relationship with Joel most frequently the subject of praise. The strength and complexity of her character, and its subversion of the damsel in distress stereotype, have also been commended. A scene in which Ellie and Riley kiss in Left Behind drew social commentary and was commended as a leap for LGBT representation in video games. Johnson's performance in Part II was praised for her depiction of vulnerability and suffering. Both the character and performance received numerous awards and nominations, and have regularly placed favorably in polls and lists. Ramsey's performance in the television series has been similarly praised.

Creation 
The concept for Ellie began with an unused idea for Uncharted 2: Among Thieves (2009). Neil Druckmann and Bruce Straley, directors of The Last of Us (2013), conceived a sequence with a mute female character who would accompany Uncharted protagonist Nathan Drake; Druckmann felt this would create a "beautiful" relationship through gameplay alone. An early alternative name for the character was Lily; Druckmann chose Ellie as he had considered the name for his daughter. Druckmann designed Ellie as a counterpart to Joel, the main playable character of The Last of Us. She was also intended to demonstrate that a character bond could be created entirely through gameplay. Druckmann described the game as a coming of age story for Ellie, in which she adopts the qualities of a survivor.

Casting 
Ashley Johnson was cast as Ellie in The Last of Us shortly after her auditions; the development team felt that she fit the role, particularly when acting alongside Troy Baker, who portrayed Joel. Johnson made important contributions to Ellie's character development. She convinced Druckmann to give Ellie a more independent personality, and to make her more successful in combat. As Ellie, Johnson's performances were mostly recorded using motion capture technology which produced approximately 85% of the game's animations. The remaining audio elements were recorded later in a studio. Johnson was sometimes uncomfortable while performing "disturbing" scenes. However, she was excited to play a rare example of a strong female video game character. For The Last of Us Part II (2020), Johnson considered her own experiences with anxiety, and researched the effects of post-traumatic stress disorder (PTSD) with Druckmann.

Appearance 

The team felt that establishing Ellie's appearance was critical. They determined that she needed to appear young enough to make her relationship with Joel—who is in his 40s—believable, but old enough to be credible as a resourceful teenager capable of surviving. The team also considered Ellie important for marketing; Druckmann said that, when asked to move the image of Ellie from the front of the game's packaging to the back, "everyone at Naughty Dog just flat-out refused".

Following the announcement of The Last of Us, comparisons were made between Ellie and actor Elliot Page. Page claimed that Naughty Dog had "ripped off" his likeness and that it was "not appreciated", as he was acting in another game, Beyond: Two Souls (2013). According to Straley, Naughty Dog had no knowledge of Page's involvement in Beyond, which was announced several months after The Last of Us. Kotaku observed that some players would likely confuse the characters. Straley said that, following the comparisons, Naughty Dog revised Ellie's appearance because "we want our characters to stand on their own two feet". Druckmann and Straley said the change was made to better reflect Johnson's personality and make her younger. It was revealed in a trailer in May 2012.

For Part II, Ellie's look underwent years of iteration; the team wanted a logical transition from the first game while maintaining a "practical yet personal" outfit. Lead character artist Ashley Swidowski designed Ellie's eyes to demonstrate a somberness; in the first game, Ellie had wider eyes to reflect her childlike nature. Ellie's moth tattoo was designed by the California-based artist Natalie Hall after the team struggled to settle on a design. Hall drew the tattoo on a developer's arm so the team could visualize it. Druckmann felt that moths' obsession with light mirrored Ellie's obsession in the game, and served as a reminder of Joel.

Writing 
The Last of Us: Left Behind (2014) was written to specifically focus on the relationship between Ellie and Riley, and to recount the events that defined their later personalities. Druckmann was also inspired by wars that took place in Syria and Afghanistan; he felt that, like Ellie, conflict was familiar to the children in those countries. Left Behind sees Riley's behavior change Ellie, resulting in the latter's focus to fight in order to save those close to her. The team was also interested in Ellie's behavior around Riley; she is perceived as being more playful. In Left Behind, Ellie and Riley share a kiss; the team considered omitting the kiss from the game, but felt that it was imperative to the story and strengthened the relationship. Though initially he only felt that Ellie viewed Riley as an influence, Druckmann later considered her romantic appeal, and decided to explore the concept.

For Part II, Druckmann recalled the team's excitement to explore Ellie further as a protagonist, particularly developing the loss of her innocence, comparing it to the feeling of the writers of Breaking Bad (2008–2013) when given the opportunity to explore Walter White. The team discussed creating a sequel without Ellie and Joel, but felt that they were less interesting.  Ellie's excitement for astronomy was based on Johnson's own interests, while her obsession with comics is based on Druckmann's childhood. Part II co-writer and narrative lead Halley Gross felt that Ellie's decision to track down Abby was motivated by her desire to overcome her PTSD more than her desire to kill Abby. Gross, who has suffered from PTSD, considered it her responsibility to accurately depict the subject matter; she wanted players who might have suffered with trauma to understand that they are not alone. The writers wanted to deconstruct the perception of violence in Joel and Ellie: while Joel is indifferent and practical, Ellie kills to maintain a "culture of honor" by attaching violence to her ego. Some of the team considered Ellie's obsession with Abby akin to a drug addiction, and that Dina left as she felt that the obsession would never end. Gross considered the game's final shot, wherein Ellie leaves behind the guitar that Joel gave her, represented Ellie moving on from his death to a new chapter. Druckmann felt that it represented Ellie finally overcoming her ego, but preferred that the player create their own interpretation.

Gameplay 
For The Last of Us, Ellie's artificial intelligence (AI) required significant overhauling of the game engine. The team had her stay close to Joel, to avoid being viewed by players as a burden. AI programmer Max Dyckhoff said that, to ensure Ellie made realistic decisions during gameplay, he considered "what she was going through" and "what her relationship with Joel and the enemies would be". During the winter segment of The Last of Us, players assume control of Ellie. The developers ensured that this change, as well as the knowledge of Ellie's immunity, was kept secret prior to the game's release to surprise players.

Television series 
Bella Ramsey's casting as Ellie in HBO's television adaptation of the games was announced on February 10, 2021. Any actresses considered for Ellie for the canceled film adaptation—such as Maisie Williams and Kaitlyn Dever—had aged out of consideration by the time the series was in production, resulting in a reset of candidates. Around 105 actors had been considered; the producers sought a performer who could portray a resourceful, quirky, and potentially violent character. After watching Ramsey's audition tape, they spoke to David Benioff and D. B. Weiss—showrunners of Game of Thrones, in which Ramsey had a recurring role—who assured them of her talent. Ramsey secured the role less than a month after her audition.

Ramsey received news of her casting during production on a different project. She said the show feels "like the biggest thing [she has] ever done" and was immediately comforted Pascal would perform alongside her for the entire experience. Ramsey was aware of the game before her audition, but was encouraged not to play it to avoid replicating the original performance, instead watching some gameplay on YouTube to "get a sense of it"; she still had not played it after filming the series. Ramsey wanted her performance to be reminiscent of the games without copying them. Ramsey, who is English, learned an American accent for the role, and had to cut off over 15 inches of hair. She wore a chest binder for 90 percent of production for better focus on set.

Character 
Ellie is described as "mature beyond her years" as a result of the circumstances of her environment. She is characterized as strong, witty, and "a little rough around the edges". Her emotional trauma is accentuated after her encounter with David. Having lost many people in her life, she suffers from severe monophobia and survivor's guilt. This results in her becoming a very hardened person; she uses violence without hesitation and frequently employs profane language. Ellie also feels worthless, believing her life is a burden and that her death would be beneficial for others. While she shows initiative, she is not as adept at survival as Joel, being somewhat impulsive and naïve. She is unable to swim until Joel teaches her how sometime before the events of Part II. Despite this, she displays great physical resilience, emotional strength, and complete fearlessness; this is demonstrated by her ability to look after both herself and Joel when he is severely injured. She constantly perseveres in dire situations. Ellie is a lesbian, pursuing female romantic interests in both Left Behind and Part II.

Appearances 

Ellie's mother, Anna, was forced to give her up shortly after she was born, and she was initially raised by Anna's friend Marlene. Ellie attends a military boarding school in the Boston quarantine zone, where she befriends Riley Abel, a fellow rebel who protects her from bullies, as depicted in the comic book series The Last of Us: American Dreams. During the events of Left Behind, which is set three weeks before The Last of Us, Riley returns after a long absence and tells Ellie that she has joined the Fireflies, a revolutionary militia group. Riley abandons her Firefly pendant when Ellie pleads for her to remain, and they kiss. After they are bitten by Infected, the two consider suicide, but choose to spend their final hours together. However, Ellie survives and discovers she is immune to infection.

In The Last of Us, a wounded Marlene tasks Joel with escorting Ellie from Boston to a drop-off point in Colorado to help the Fireflies develop a vaccine from her immunity. Ellie is initially annoyed by Joel's surliness, but they develop a bond. Upon learning that he intends to leave her with his younger brother Tommy and return to Boston, she runs away. After Joel pursues her, she confronts him, insisting that he not abandon her, and they continue their journey. Ellie becomes traumatized and withdrawn after an encounter in which she is assaulted and nearly murdered by a band of cannibals, forcing her to hack their leader David to death with a machete. After finding the Colorado base destroyed, Joel and Ellie finally reach the Fireflies at a hospital in Salt Lake City, where Joel discovers that the Fireflies cannot create a vaccine without killing Ellie during surgery because they must remove the mutant strain of the fungus from her brain. He kills Marlene and the Fireflies, makes his way to the operating room, and carries the unconscious Ellie to safety. He later lies to Ellie, telling her that the Fireflies had already found dozens of other immune people and had stopped seeking a cure. When Ellie confronts Joel, describing her survivor's guilt and her urge to know the truth, he reassures her that he is telling the truth.

In The Last of Us Part II, Ellie and Joel have settled in Tommy's community in Jackson. Joel gifts Ellie a guitar, fulfilling his promise to teach her how to play. Ellie eventually returns to the Firefly hospital and discovers the truth. She is furious with Joel, feeling that her life would have mattered had the surgery gone ahead. The relationship between the two is strained. Ellie eventually promises Joel that she will try to forgive him, but she witnesses his murder the next day at the hands of Abby, a militia soldier and the daughter of the Firefly surgeon Joel had killed while saving Ellie. Along with girlfriend Dina, Tommy, and Dina's ex-boyfriend Jesse, Ellie travels to the militia's home turf in Seattle to exact revenge. Along the way, Ellie reveals her immunity to Dina, and Dina reveals she is pregnant with Jesse's child. After Ellie kills several members of Abby's group, Abby kills Jesse, cripples Tommy, and overpowers Ellie and Dina. She spares their lives and tells them to leave Seattle. Some time later, Ellie and Dina are living on a farm near Jackson and raising Dina's baby, JJ, but Ellie suffers from post-traumatic stress. Despite Dina's pleas, Ellie tracks Abby to Santa Barbara, where she frees an enslaved Abby from a group of bandits. She then has a flashback to Joel's death, and forces Abby into a fight. Abby bites off two of Ellie's fingers, but Ellie overpowers and starts drowning her; she ultimately lets Abby go after experiencing a happier memory of Joel. Ellie returns to the farmhouse and finds it empty. She struggles to play Joel's guitar with her missing fingers. She recalls her promise to forgive Joel, leaves the guitar, and walks away.

Reception 

Ellie's character received generally positive feedback. Jason Killingsworth of Edge praised Ellie's complexity and commended Naughty Dog for not having made her "a subordinate ... precocious teen girl that Joel must babysit". Ashley Reed and Andy Hartup of GamesRadar named Ellie one of the "most inspirational female characters in games", writing that she is "one of the most modern, realistic characters ever designed". Eurogamers Ellie Gibson commended the character's strength and vulnerability, praising the game's subversion of the damsel in distress cliché. GamesRadar listed Ellie among the best characters of the video game generation, stating that her courage exceeds that of most male characters. IGNs Greg Miller compared Ellie to Elizabeth from BioShock Infinite (2013), and felt that the former was a "much more rounded out, full-fledged" character. Conversely, Game Informers Kimberley Wallace felt that the game focused too much on Joel, "hardly capitalizing on Ellie's importance", and Chris Suellentrop of The New York Times judged that Ellie is cast "in a secondary, more subordinate role".

Critics praised the relationship between Ellie and Joel. Matt Helgeson of Game Informer wrote that the relationship was "poignant" and "well-drawn", Joystiqs Richard Mitchell found it "genuine" and emotional, and IGNs Colin Moriarty identified it as a highlight of the game. Eurogamers Oli Welsh felt the characters were developed with "real patience and skill". Philip Kollar of Polygon found the relationship was assisted by the game's optional conversations. Wallace of Game Informer named Joel and Ellie one of the "best gaming duos of 2013", appreciating their interest in protecting each other. Game Informers Kyle Hilliard compared Joel and Ellie's relationship to that of the Prince and Elika from Prince of Persia (2008), writing that both duos care deeply for one another, and praising the "emotional crescendo" in The Last of Us, which he judged had not been achieved in Prince of Persia. PlayStation Official Magazines David Meikleham named Joel and Ellie the best characters in a PlayStation 3 game.

Following the release of Left Behind, Ellie's relationship with Riley was commended by reviewers. GameSpots Tom McShea felt a new appreciation for Ellie by seeing her actions around Riley. The Daily Telegraphs Tim Martin praised the characters' interactions, and Eurogamers Stace Harman felt that Left Behind improves the understanding of Joel and Ellie's relationship. Kotakus Kirk Hamilton described Ellie and Riley's kiss as "video gaming's latest breakthrough moment", declaring it "a big deal". Keza MacDonald of IGN wrote that the kiss was "so beautiful and natural and funny that [she] was left dumbstruck". IGNs Luke Karmali questioned Naughty Dog's motivation behind the kiss, noting the "bait-and-switch" in which they made players care for the character before revealing her sexuality, but ultimately dismissed this and commended the handling of Ellie's sexuality and the subtlety of the writing. Polygons Colin Campbell named Ellie and Riley among the best video game characters of the 2010s, citing their differences and eventual closeness.

Johnson received acclaim for her performance in The Last of Us Part II. Destructoids Chris Carter praised her ability to play the character again after many years. Oli Welsh of Eurogamer found Johnson's performance to be "standout" due to her depiction of "rawness, vulnerability, and rage". GamesRadar+s Alex Avard considered Johnson's portrayal of suffering "nothing short of awards worthy". Regarding the character, Jonathon Dornbush of IGN wrote that Johnson added nuance to every element of Ellie. The Washington Posts Elise Favis praised the game's depiction of Ellie coming out to Joel, comparing it to her own experience and the difficulty of approaching the topic with her father. Rafael Motamayor of Observer felt that Ellie's character was improved by the inclusion of Abby's story. Mashables Jess Joho criticized the character for relying too heavily on her relationship with Joel. Polygons Maddy Myers and Wireds Julie Muncy criticized Ellie's development and inability to learn from her mistakes.

The character of Ellie won year-end awards for The Last of Us and Left Behind, including Best New Character from Hardcore Gamer and Most Valuable Character at the SXSW Gaming Awards for Left Behind; she received a nomination for Best Character from Destructoid. Ashley Johnson's performance also received various accolades: Performer at the 10th and 11th British Academy Video Games Awards, Outstanding Character Performance the 17th Annual D.I.C.E. Awards, Best Voice Actress at the Spike VGX 2013, and Best Performer from The Daily Telegraph. For her role in The Last of Us Part II, Johnson was named co-winner of Outstanding Lead Performance in a Drama at the National Academy of Video Game Trade Reviewers (NAVGTR) Awards. She was also nominated for Best Performance at The Game Awards 2020 and from IGN, and Performer in a Leading Role at the 17th British Academy Games Awards; she lost all three awards to Laura Bailey, who played Abby. Ellie was nominated for Outstanding Achievement in Character at the 24th Annual D.I.C.E. Awards. Johnson is currently nominated for Best Voice Performance at the 19th Game Audio Network Guild Awards.

In the television series, Ramsey's performance and chemistry with Pedro Pascal's Joel received high praise. Kotaku Australias David Smith called Ramsey "perhaps the pilot's greatest triumph", especially in her scenes with Pascal. By the fourth episode, Push Squares Bayne felt Ramsey's performance would win over viewers who doubted her casting, lauding her portrayal of both trauma and humor. The Washington Posts Gene Park similarly wrote the episode was "Ramsey's time to flex those muscles" of humor. In the fifth episode, Den of Geeks Bernard Boo called Ramsey's reaction to Henry's death "utterly heartbreaking", and Total Films Bradley Russell found her performance throughout the episode made the moment more effective, and was ultimately worthy of awards consideration. Boo thought the sixth episode featured "possibly the best performances of [Ramsey's] career". io9s Germain Lussier felt Ramsey's performance shone in Ellie and Joel's confrontation, and IGNs Simon Cardy praised Ramsey's continued ability to switch between emotion and comedy.

Notes

References 
Bibliography

Sources

Action-adventure game characters
Amputee characters in video games
Female characters in video games
Fictional American people in video games
Fictional archers
Fictional characters from Boston
Fictional characters with disfigurements
Fictional characters with post-traumatic stress disorder
Fictional lesbians
Fictional guitarists
Fictional marksmen and snipers
Fictional sole survivors
Fictional thieves
Fictional torturers
Fictional mass murderers
Fictional zombie hunters
Horror video game characters
The Last of Us
LGBT characters in video games
Orphan characters in video games
Sony Interactive Entertainment protagonists
Teenage characters in video games
Video game characters introduced in 2013
Vigilante characters in video games
Woman soldier and warrior characters in video games
Television characters introduced in 2023